Trance (Hope Abbott) is a fictional character appearing in comic books published by the Marvel Comics.  A mutant, Hope attended the Xavier Institute before its closing. She retained her powers after M-Day and is a member of the X-Men's training squad.

Fictional character biography
Hope was raised in Bloomfield Hills, Michigan. When Hope's powers manifested, it appeared as if a ghost had come out of her body, giving her father a heart attack. She was then sent to the Xavier Institute by her parents believing that she would be "cured."

While at the institute, Hope was put in the Paragons Squad under the watch of Wolfsbane. Hope then took on the codename Trance. When it was outed that Wolfsbane and a student (Elixir) had been in a relationship, Wolfsbane decided to leave. Magma then took over as the squad's advisor.

When the events of Decimation transpired, she was one of only 27 students to keep her powers. Greatly weakened by the losses, Emma Frost placed all of the remaining students into an all-out brawl to determine who would become the team of X-Men in-training.  Hope did not make the team yet, like all of the other students who retained their powers, still resides at the institute.

In response to M-Day, the government began gathering all information they had on the remaining mutants. Additionally, the Sentinel Squad O*N*E, a team of human-piloted Sentinels, was sent to "watch over" the X-Men and the handful of refugees symbolically known as The 198.  According to said files, Hope was willing to work with other mutants in training sessions but had not yet received any combat experience.

Hope's interests include old films, House Music, classical music and Psytrance and it appears she is rather culturally sophisticated. Her classmates voted her 'best-dressed' in the yearbook.

Quest for Magik
Trance is among the students who were captured by Belasco and transported to Limbo. As per X-23's request, Trance uses her astral projection to warn the students who weren't captured of Belasco's return. Thanks to Trance, the students were successfully saved and brought back by the X-Men.

Messiah Complex
Trance was present at the Institute when Predator X attacked the school. Trance barely got out of the way in time. Unfortunately the school was shut down and all the students were sent home.

Killing Made Simple
Blindfold had a vision and informed the X-Men that Trance was going to be in trouble. While having dinner with her family, Trance's home was attacked by Orphan-Maker on Nanny's orders, but Trance wasn't his target, her parents were. Luckily Wolverine had been sent by the X-Men to watch over her. Springing to action, Wolverine tries to fight off Orphan Maker but is overpowered. With a change of plans, Trance and Wolverine are kidnapped. Trance is later seen tied to a chair with Wolverine chained to the ground. Trance, believing that Wolverine will save them, refuses to use her powers. After realizing that Wolverine cannot help her, she astral projects outside her body and begins blasting Nanny and Orphan-Maker. The two villains eventually eject in an escape pod, leaving the ship to crash. Using her energy blasts, Trance disables the self-destruct timer. The ship crashes in a lake, but Trance and Wolverine are safe.

Utopia
Trance later relocates to San Francisco along with all the other X-Men.

Trance is seen with Dragoness and Toad, who are being pursued by H.A.M.M.E.R. agents. After Dragoness is taken out, Trance goes into her astral form only to have her power disrupted when her body is shot with tasers. Gambit shows up and knocks out the H.A.M.M.E.R. agents. Trance, in her astral form, lies on the ground asking for help when Ariel and Onyxx appear and take her body away to safety. Later, Mindee Cuckoo informs Rogue that Trance never made it back to base and that she is detecting Trance's thoughts somewhere downtown, prompting Rogue and her team to search for her. Trance's power disrupted Ariel's attempt to teleport her to safety.  Rogue finds Trance and her powers are flaring out of control creating powerful uncontrollable bio-electric blasts. Rogue tries to help calm Trance and help her gain control when Ms Marvel appears. After taking out Gambit and Danger, Rogue and Ms Marvel fight, unfortunately Rogue is losing until Trance regains control and jumps in to help Rogue. Trance learns that her astral form is able to punch Ms Marvel when they are both intangible.  After  Gambit stuns Ms Marvel, they teleport back to base where Trance receives medical attention.

Necrosha
Trance is seen with Husk and the New X-Men battling the resurrected Synch and Skin.

Trance is part of a team of X-Men that investigates Blindfold's vision about Muir Island. Trance, along with most other members of this team, is briefly possessed by Proteus when he attacks. This possession is interrupted by Rogue's use of Psylocke's psychic knife.  The team eventually defeats Proteus before returning to Utopia.

Second Coming
During the events of Second Coming, Cannonball recruits Trance along with Northstar, Dazzler, Anole, Gambit, and Pixie on a mission to recover Magik from Limbo.  Hope is initially reluctant to accept this mission, but agrees to go as long as she can leave her body on Earth.  Upon arriving in Limbo, the team becomes separated when they are overwhelmed by Limbo's demonic inhabitants.  Trance fights alongside Pixie and tries to protect Pixie from the influence of Magik's demon, N'Astirh.  The effort, however, causes Trance to disappear from Limbo and reawaken in her body in Utopia.

Wolverine and the X-Men
Trance is currently a student at the Jean Grey School for Higher Learning.

Powers and abilities

Trance has the power of astral projection and as her code name suggests, she goes into some kind of altered state of consciousness or somehow otherwise nullifies her body in order to release her astral self. This observation was further affirmed when she asked Emma Frost if she could leave her body outside the danger room during an exercise. Her astral form is capable of flight and can pass through magic barriers.  Her astral form was able to physically punch Moonstone's intangible form.  Trance's astral form is additionally able to project destructive energy. When hit with tasers by H.A.M.M.E.R. agents during X-Men: Legacy #226 in the middle of entering her trance state, her powers flare out of control, disrupting Ariel's attempt to teleport her to safety.  She also creates arcing energy surges that stun soldiers and even bend nearby metal and concrete.  According to Danger and Rogue, this appears to be a new part of her power which she has not learned to control.

She can also perceive auras and energy patterns that are invisible to the naked human eye such as the emotional state of others from their auras, heat signatures and energy patterns in the air. Doctor Nemesis further speculates that Trance's powers seem to react to spatial warps and energy fields; however, he doesn't know if this is a permanent or a temporary development.

Other media

Television
 She appears in the episode "Greetings from Genosha" from  Wolverine and the X-Men series.

References

Comics characters introduced in 2005
Marvel Comics mutants
Fictional characters from Michigan
Marvel Comics female superheroes
Characters created by Nunzio DeFilippis
Characters created by Christina Weir

pt:Astral